is the third studio album of Hello! Project soloist Kaori Iida and is her first album in Japanese. Concurrently, it was her last album that was released when she was still a member of the idol group Morning Musume. It was released on December 29, 2004 with catalog number EPCE-2030.

The album's first pressing included Hello! Project photo card #94.

Track listing 
 
Lyrics: Junko Sadou
Composer: Rie
Arranger: Chijou Maeno
 
Lyrics: Kaori Iida
Composer: Kazunori Ashizawa
Arranger: Chijou Maeno
 
Lyrics: Tokuko Miura
Composer: Tsunku
Arranger: Kouji Makaino
 
Lyrics: Natsumi Watanabe
Composer: Kazunori Ashizawa
Arranger: Chijou Maeno
 
Lyrics: Natsumi Watanabe
Composer: Ichiro Kaneda
Arranger: Chijou Maeno
 
Lyrics: 
Composer: Hitoshi Haba
 
Lyrics: Yuho Iwasato
Composer: Taisei
Arranger: Chijou Maeno
 
Lyrics: Tokuko Miura
Composer: Tsunku
Arranger: Chijou Maeno
 
Lyrics: Yuho Iwasato
Composer: Kiyonori Matsuo
Arranger: Chijou Maeno
 
Lyrics: Junko Sadou
Composer: Kazunori Ashizawa
Arranger: Chijou Maeno
 
Lyrics: Yuho Iwasato
Composer: Hitoshi Haba
Arranger: Chijou Maeno
 
Lyrics: Junko Sadou
Composer: Akira Inaba (composer)
Arranger: Chijou Maeno

References

External links 
 Avenir: Mirai entry at Up-Front Works Official Website
 Avenir: Mirai entry at Kaori Iida Database

Kaori Iida albums
Chichūkai Label albums
2004 albums